Encamp is one of the parishes of Andorra, located on the Valira d'Orient river. It is also the name of the main town in the parish. Other settlements include Vila, El Pas de la Casa, Grau Roig, El Tremat, La Mosquera and Les Bons. As of 2004, it has about 11,800 inhabitants. The highest mountain in the parish is Pic dels Pessons.

Geography

Climate
Encamp has a oceanic climate (Köppen climate classification Cfb).

Radio transmitter
Radio Andorra operated a transmitter at Lake Engolasters in Encamp from 7 August 1939 until 9 April 1981.

Economy
The economy of the parish is mostly based on its tourism industry, particularly skiing and hiking. There is also retail industry in the town of Encamp. There is a hydroelectric power station.

Transport
A road tunnel is being built between Encamp and Anyós in the neighbouring parish of La Massana; It cut journey times from 10 to 15 minutes to 5 minutes.

A cable car used to connect the town with Lake Engolasters, but it has been dismantled. However, a 2-stretch funitel built in 1998 connects Encamp with a ridge at 2.500 m within Grandvalira ski resort, thus assuring a lift+ski link with El Pas de la Casa and the rest of the domain.

Education

The Spanish international primary school Escuela Española de la Vall d'Orient is located in Encamp.

Notable people 

 Josep Carles Laínez (born 1970 in Valencia) is a Spanish writer, has a home in Encamp
 Verònica Canals i Riba is the current Minister of Tourism

References

External links

Encamp at the Encyclopædia Britannica
Encamp photos

 
Parishes of Andorra
Populated places in Andorra